Guantánamo River is a river of southern Cuba, that flows Province of Guantánamo up to Guantánamo Bay. It is impounded by La Yaya Dam.

See also
List of rivers of Cuba

References
The Columbia Gazetteer of North America. 2000.

External links

Rivers of Cuba
Geography of Guantánamo Province